Orangeville Aerodrome, Orangeville Airport, Orangeville Airfield, or variation, may refer to:

 Orangeville/Brundle Field Aerodrome (TC id: COB4), Orangeville, Dufferin, Ontario, Canada
 Orangeville/Castlewood Field Aerodrome (TC id: CPV2), Orangeville, Dufferin, Ontario, Canada
 Orangeville/Laurel Aerodrome (TC id: COL2), Amaranth, Dufferin, Ontario, Canada
 Orangeville/Rosehill Aerodrome (TC id: COR8), Orangeville, Dufferin, Ontario, Canada

See also
Search for ... Orangeville Aerodrome
Search for ... Orangeville Aeroport
Search for ... Orangeville Airport
Search for ... Orangeville Airfield
Search for ... Orangeville Field
 Orangeville (disambiguation)